Mordechai HaKohen of Safed (1523–1598) was a scholar and kabbalist who flourished in the second half of the sixteenth century in Safed. He was a pupil of the famous kabbalist Israel di Curiel, and a contemporary of Joseph di Trani. Mordechai wrote an allegoric-kabalistic commentary on the Pentateuch, entitled Sifte Kohen. He had to leave Safed due to financial hardships and took up position of rabbi of Aleppo, Syria in 1570.

References 

Jewish Encyclopedia bibliography: Azulai, Shem ha-Gedolim, s.v.; Steinschneider, Cat. Bodl. col. 1669.

1523 births
1598 deaths
16th-century rabbis from the Ottoman Empire
Kabbalists
Kohanim writers of Rabbinic literature
Rabbis in Aleppo
Rabbis in Ottoman Palestine
Rabbis in Safed
Rabbis in Ottoman Galilee